Zinc finger transcription factors or ZF-TFs, are transcription factors composed of a zinc finger-binding domain and any of a variety of transcription-factor effector-domains that exert their modulatory effect in the vicinity of any sequence to which the protein domain binds.

Zinc finger protein transcription factors can be encoded by genes small enough to fit a number of such genes into a single vector, allowing the medical intervention and control of expression of multiple genes and the initiation of an elaborate cascade of events. In this respect, it is also possible to target a sequence that is common to multiple (usually functionally related) genes in order to control the transcription of all these genes with a single transcription factor. Also, it is possible to target a family of related genes by targeting and modulating the expression of the endogenous transcription factor(s) that control(s) them. They also have the advantage that the targeted sequence need not be symmetrical unlike with most other DNA-binding motifs based on natural transcription factors that bind as dimers.

Applications
By targeting the ZF-TF toward a specific DNA sequence and attaching the necessary effector domain, it is possible to downregulate or upregulate the expression of the gene(s) in question while using the same DNA-binding domain. The expression of a gene can also be downregulated by blocking elongation by RNA polymerase (without the need for an effector domain) in the coding region or alternatively, RNA itself can also be targeted. Besides the obvious development of tools for the research of gene function, engineered ZF-TFs have therapeutic potential including correction of abnormal gene expression profiles (e.g., erbB-2 overexpression in human adenocarcinomas) and anti-retrovirals (e.g. HIV-1).

See also
Artificial transcription factor, of which the ZF-TF is a type
Gene therapy
Zinc finger proteins
Zinc finger chimera
Zinc finger nuclease

References

Transcription factors
Zinc proteins